Seggana District is a district of Batna Province, Algeria.

Municipalities
The district further divides into two municipalities.
Seggana
Tilatou

Districts of Batna Province